Aodhan Quinn (born March 22, 1992) is an American professional soccer player who currently plays for Indy Eleven in the USL Championship.

Career

Early career
Quinn played college soccer at Bradley University in 2010 and at the University of Akron between 2011 and 2013. During his time at college Quinn also played for USL PDL clubs Akron Summit Assault during their 2011 season, and Seattle Sounders FC U-23 during their 2012 and 2013 seasons.

Professional
Quinn was selected by Philadelphia Union in the third round of the 2014 MLS SuperDraft (52nd overall), but wasn't signed by the club. Quinn later signed with USL Pro club Orlando City on March 19, 2014. He was released upon the conclusion of the 2014 season, a casualty of the club's transition to Major League Soccer.

Quinn signed with Louisville City on May 11, 2015.

In January 2017 it was announced that Quinn was leaving Louisville City FC to play for FC Cincinnati. Following the close of the 2017 season, FC Cincinnati announced they would not exercise the option to have Quinn return in 2018.

Quinn joined Orange County SC on December 15, 2017.

Quinn signed with Phoenix Rising FC on December 3, 2020. He scored a goal on his league debut in a 4-1 win over San Diego Loyal on April 30, 2021.

On January 19, 2023, Quinn transferred to Indy Eleven.

Personal life
Quinn is the son of the former Everton player and United States international Brian Quinn.

Quinn is a 2010 graduate of Mt Carmel High School in San Diego, California.

References

External links

 
 Akron Zips bio

1992 births
Living people
American soccer players
Bradley Braves men's soccer players
Akron Zips men's soccer players
Akron Summit Assault players
Seattle Sounders FC U-23 players
Orlando City SC (2010–2014) players
Louisville City FC players
Association football midfielders
Soccer players from San Diego
Philadelphia Union draft picks
USL League Two players
USL Championship players
FC Cincinnati (2016–18) players
Orange County SC players
Phoenix Rising FC players
Indy Eleven players
All-American men's college soccer players